James Thayer (1853–1886) was a United States Navy sailor and a recipient of the United States military's highest decoration, the Medal of Honor.

Born in 1853 in Ireland, Thayer immigrated to the United States and joined the Navy from Pennsylvania. On that day, while Constitution was at the Norfolk Naval Shipyard in Virginia, he rescued a young shipmate from drowning. For this action, he was awarded the Medal of Honor five years later, on October 18, 1884.

Thayer's official Medal of Honor citation reads:
For rescuing from drowning a boy serving with him on the U.S.S. Constitution, at the Navy Yard, Norfolk, Va., 16 November 1879.

See also

List of Medal of Honor recipients during peacetime

References

External links

1853 births
1886 deaths
19th-century Irish people
Irish sailors in the United States Navy
Irish emigrants to the United States (before 1923)
United States Navy sailors
United States Navy Medal of Honor recipients
Irish-born Medal of Honor recipients
Non-combat recipients of the Medal of Honor